Kasirayi Sita (born July 29, 1978) is a male long-distance runner from Zimbabwe. He won the 2005 edition of the Stockholm Marathon. Sita set his personal best (2:12:42) in the men's marathon on October 9, 2005 in Eindhoven, Netherlands.

Achievements

External links

1978 births
Living people
Zimbabwean male long-distance runners
Zimbabwean male marathon runners